Henrik Lundgaard (born 26 February 1969) is a Danish rally driver. In 2000, he won the European Rally Championship in a Toyota Corolla WRC. He has also been a driver on the race track as well, competing in one season of the European Touring Car Cup (2007), and also the Danish Touringcar Championship (2nd in 2004, 2008).

He scored World Rally Championship points in 1997 as well.

Lundgaard's sons Christian and Daniel are also racing drivers Christian is currently competing in the 2022 IndyCar Series.

References

1969 births
Living people
Danish racing drivers
European Rally Championship drivers
People from Hedensted Municipality
Sportspeople from the Central Denmark Region

Toyota Gazoo Racing drivers